Martin Repinski (born on 6 August 1986 in Kohtla-Järve, Ida-Viru County) is an Estonian politician. He has been a member of the XIII and the XIV Riigikogu. In 2016 he was shortly Minister of Agriculture.

He has studied at Estonian Entrepreneurship University of Applied Sciences in financial management.

From 2004 to 2013 he was a member of Estonian Centre Party.

References

1986 births
Agriculture ministers of Estonia
Estonian Centre Party politicians
Living people
Members of the Riigikogu, 2015–2019
Members of the Riigikogu, 2019–2023
People from Kohtla-Järve